was a Japanese mass murderer who killed a woman on December 16, 1963, and shot dead four people on January 26, 1979. Mass media also used a number of different possible readings of his given name, including Teruyoshi, Terumi, Akimi and Akemi. He was one of the rare criminals who was shot dead by Japanese police.

Early life
Umekawa was born in Otake, Hiroshima Prefecture.  He was a great reader and loved hardboiled fiction. On December 16, 1963, while he was 15 and still a minor, he killed a woman. Although he was a murderer, he was still allowed to have guns because Japanese juvenile law protected his criminal history. He also saw the film Salò, or the 120 Days of Sodom. He wanted to make a big incident 15 years after he committed the first murder.

Mitsubishi Bank hostage incident
Umekawa shot dead two employees and two policemen on January 26, 1979, in a Mitsubishi Bank in Sumiyoshi-ku, Osaka. He took 40 hostages at the bank. He asked them, "Do you know Sodom no Ichi (Japanese alternative title of Salò, or the 120 Days of Sodom)?" He stripped women of their clothes.

Rokuro Yoshida, who joined the criminal investigations of Kiyoshi Ōkubo and the United Red Army, was appointed as the incident commander. "Zero" Company of the 2nd Riot Police Unit of the Osaka Prefectural Police Headquarters (one of the predecessors of the Special Assault Teams) were called, which was the first case in the history of Japanese Police Tactical Units. They fatally shot Umekawa on January 28, 1979. Yoshida stated there was no alternative to deadly force.

Media
His crime affected Japanese youths. Lyricist Neko Oikawa said that he was the main reason why she did not have leftist views. The story of the film Tattoo Ari was inspired by him, but an alternative name was used for him in the film.

See also
Special Assault Team
Salò, or the 120 Days of Sodom

References

External links 

 Mitsubishi Bank Incident
 Mitsubishi Bank Murders

1948 births
1979 deaths
Minors convicted of murder
Japanese mass murderers
Hostage taking in Japan
People shot dead by law enforcement officers
Deaths by firearm in Japan
People from Hiroshima Prefecture
Japanese serial killers
20th-century Japanese criminals
Male serial killers